The guitarra latina is a plucked string instrument of the Medieval period in Europe. It has single string courses, and it is normally played with a pick. This gittern or citole with curved sides is illustrated in the medieval musical text the Cantigas de Santa Maria, alongside another gittern, the guitarra morisca.

References
The New Grove Dictionary of Music and Musicians. Macmillan Publishers, 1980. .

External links

Guitars
Medieval musical instruments